Goura may refer to:

Places
 Goura, Corinthia, a village in Greece
 Goura, Centre Region, Cameroon
 Goura, Far North Region, Cameroon
 Goura Nature Reserve, now part of Gulaga National Park, New South Wales, Australia
 Goura, Phthiotis, a former village in Greece

Other uses
 Goura (genus), a genus of pigeons
 Goura (musical instrument), a mouth-blown stringed musical instrument

See also
 Gora (disambiguation)